Stefan Psenak (born 1969 in Joliette, Quebec) is a Canadian poet, playwright, novelist and politician from Quebec.

He won the Trillium Book Award in 1998 for Du chaos et de l'ordre des choses, and was a nominee for the Governor General's Award for French-language poetry in 2001 for La beauté.

He served on Gatineau City Council from 2009 to 2013, representing Aylmer District. He was first elected in the 2009 Gatineau municipal election, but was defeated by Josée Lacasse in the 2013 Gatineau municipal election.

References

External links
 Official site

1969 births
21st-century Canadian dramatists and playwrights
21st-century Canadian novelists
Canadian male novelists
21st-century Canadian poets
Canadian poets in French
Living people
People from Joliette
Writers from Gatineau
Gatineau city councillors
Canadian novelists in French
Canadian dramatists and playwrights in French
Canadian male poets
Canadian male dramatists and playwrights
21st-century Canadian male writers